SS-45, SS 45 or SS45 may refer to:

 SS-45 Missile, a surface-to-air missile of the Union of India Army
 USS L-6 (SS-45), a submarine of the United States Navy which saw service during World War I

and also:

 USS S-45 (SS-156), a submarine of the United States Navy commissioned in 1920